Doxa Theologos Potos Football Club is a Greek football club based in Theologos, Kavala, Greece.

Honours

Domestic

 Kavala FCA Champions: 1
 2018–19

References

External links

Football clubs in Eastern Macedonia and Thrace
Thasos
Association football clubs established in 1979
1979 establishments in Greece
Gamma Ethniki clubs